Diavik may refer to:

Diavik Diamond Mine, in Canada's Northwest Territories
Diavik Airport, that serves the Diavik Diamond Mine